Paula Marcela Moreno Zapata (born 11 November 1978) is a Colombian engineer and professor. She served as the 8th Minister of Culture of Colombia in the administration of President Álvaro Uribe Vélez. Moreno became the first Afro-Colombian woman, as well as the youngest person, to hold a Cabinet position in Colombia. She was a Hubert H. Humphrey Fellow in the Special Program for Urban and Regional Studies at Massachusetts Institute of Technology. As a non-degree program, the Fellowship offers valuable opportunities for professional development through selected university courses, attending conferences, networking, and practical work experiences during one year.

Background
Moreno studied at the Istituto Italiano di Cultura from 1996 to 1998, graduating with a degree in Italian Language and Culture, and simultaneously attending the Autonomous University of Colombia, where she graduated in 2001 with a Bachelor of Science in Industrial Engineering. In 2003 she attended the University of Cambridge thanks to a COLFUTURO Fellowship, where she obtained her Master of Philosophy in Management Studies. In 2010, she was awarded a Hubert H. Humphrey Fellow (As a non-degree program, the Fellowship offers valuable opportunities for professional development through selected university courses, attending conferences, networking, and practical work experiences during one year) in the Special Program for Urban and Regional Studies at Massachusetts Institute of Technology. More recently, in 2014, Moreno has been selected as one of the sixteen global leaders to be a Yale World Fellow.

Career
Moreno is the President of Manos Visibles, a Colombian NGO. She also serves as a board member at the Ford Foundation, the Inter-American Dialogue and Association for the study of the Worldwide African Diaspora ASWAD. She had previously been working in the academic and development fields before being appointed as Minister of Culture. She was national coordinator, project manager and consultant of several development agencies, such as UNESCO, Panamerican Health Organization (PAHO), as well of community organizations and the Ministry of Interior in Colombia. At the same time, she was researcher at the Center of Latin American Studies at the University of Cambridge, Assistant Professor in the Engineering Department at the Autonomous University, and a Consultant for the Management Studies Department at the University of the Andes.

Minister of Culture
Moreno was appointed  on 10 May 2007 as the new Minister of Culture of Colombia by President Álvaro Uribe Vélez. President Uribe was quick to point out Moreno's qualifications, and on 1 June 2007 Uribe swore in Moreno as the 8th Minister of Culture in a ceremony that took place at the Office of the Presidency of Colombia. She was the first Afro-Colombian woman to ever hold a cabinet as well as the youngest person to do so, and the fourth person of Afro-Colombian descent to be a cabinet minister in the history of Colombia.

During her time in office, her most important and visible work centered around the legislative agenda, three new laws were approved by congress for the heritage, national system of libraries, and the protection of native languages. Additionally, the advancement in national cultural policies by two new state policies for historical centers, and cultural industries and the first compendium of cultural policies.  She started new national plans, such as the National Plan for Dance and the National Audiovisual Plan; more than 20 new plans and programs were created in this period.

One of the most visible and recognized work that Moreno lead was around the international agenda for Colombia. The country had major spots at international events such the Guadalajara bookfare and film festivals, the Conference for the Afrodescendant Agenda for the Americas in 2008, and the Iberoamerican Congress for Culture in 2010. At the national level, she led the bicentennial anniversary of the Independence of Colombia that took place in 2010. In addition, for three years the Ministry of Culture organized the National Grand Concert, a massive live concert that took place in 1102 municipalities of Colombia and 44 embassies around the world, and broadcast in national television with an audience of more than 10 million Colombians, with the participation of more than a 200,000 artists performing in different stages across the country, and included artist such as Carlos Vives, Juanes and Shakira, as well as folkloric dance and music groups that represented all of the variations of music and dances of Colombia.

Paula Moreno is the President of Visible Hands Foundation and advisor of international agencies.

Visible Hands (Manos Visibles)

Visible Hands is a Colombian NGO funded in 2010 by Moreno and Colombian leaders Hernan Bravo and Patricia Alvarez. It main aim is to promote effective social inclusion and integration in Colombia by empowering grassroots leaders to change the power relations in Colombia. In particular, the Visible Hands are leaders and organizations that promote self- inclusion and work for peace building in the most violent and vulnerable areas in Colombia. This network integrates more than 500 leaders and organizations, among them top universities, Colombian leaders and the media. Visible Hands is funded by BBVA, The Ford Foundation, Avina Foundation, National Endowment for Democracy among other national and international organizations. The main programs of Visible Hands are: The Youth and Peace Building Fund, the Pacific Power Program, DALE and Development Management Executive Program.

Honors
More recently, Paula Moreno  is recognized by BBC as one of the 100 women, top leaders in the world  
For her service to the Government of Colombia and the nation as Minister of Culture, Moreno was awarded the Order of Saint Charles in 2010 by President Uribe, and in 2011 she was awarded the Order of the Aztec Eagle by President of Mexico Felipe de Jesús Calderón Hinojosa for her contribution to the improvement of Colombia – Mexico relations during her term as Minister of Culture. In addition, she also received the Unita Blackwell Award 2009 given by the Women's Committee of the National Conference of Black Mayors of the United States for her contribution to the cultural development of Afro-Colombian communities.

Personal life
She was born in Bogotá, D.C. on 11 November 1978 to Armando Moreno, a retired civil servant of the Bogotá Aqueducts, and María Zényde Zapata, a lawyer, both originally from the Department of Cauca.

Monthly Column - EL TIEMPO Newspaper Colombia http://www.eltiempo.com/opinion/columnistas/paula-moreno

Selected works

See also
 Juan José Nieto Gil
 Luis Antonio Robles
 Josefina Valencia Muñoz

References

External links 

1978 births
Living people
21st-century Colombian women politicians
21st-century Colombian politicians
Afro-Colombian women
Alumni of Hughes Hall, Cambridge
BBC 100 Women
Colombian industrial engineers
Colombian Ministers of Culture
Members of the Inter-American Dialogue
People from Bogotá
Women government ministers of Colombia